The men's tournament of Handball at the 2016 Summer Olympics at Rio de Janeiro, Brazil, began on 7 August and ended on 21 August 2016. Games were held at the Future Arena.

Denmark won their first gold medal, defeating defending champion France 28–26 in the final. Germany won the bronze medal by defeating Poland 31–25.

The medals were presented by Gunilla Lindberg, Yumilka Ruiz and Tony Estanguet, IOC members from Sweden, Cuba and France respectively and by Hassan Moustafa, Miguel Roca Mas and Per Bertelsen, President, 1st Vice President and Caretaker Chairman of the Commission of Organizing and Competition of the IHF respectively.

Competition schedule

Qualification

Competition format
The twelve teams in the tournament were divided into two groups of six, with each team initially playing round-robin games within their group. Following the completion of the round-robin stage, the top four teams from each group advance to the quarter-finals. The two semi-final winners meet for the gold medal match, while the semi-final losers play in the bronze medal match.

Referees
16 refereeing pairs were selected on 5 July 2016.

Rosters

Draw
The draw took place on 29 April 2016.

Seeding
The seeding was announced on 10 April 2016.

Group stage
All times are local (UTC−3).

Group A

Group B

Knockout stage

Bracket

Quarterfinals

Semifinals

Bronze medal game

Gold medal game

Ranking and statistics

Final ranking

Source: IHF.info

All-star team
 Goalkeeper:  Niklas Landin Jacobsen
 Left wing:  Uwe Gensheimer
 Left back:  Mikkel Hansen
 Central back:  Nikola Karabatic
 Right back:  Valentin Porte
 Right wing:  Lasse Svan Hansen
 Line player:  Cedric Sorhaindo
 MVP:  Mikkel Hansen

Source: IHF.info

Top goalscorers

Source: IHF

Top goalkeepers

Source: IHF

Medalists

References

External links
Official website

Men's tournament
Men's events at the 2016 Summer Olympics